Pifithrin-α (chemical name 2-(2-Imino-4,5,6,7-tetrahydrobenzothiazol-3-yl)-1-p-tolylethanone hydrobromide) is an off-white in color chemical inhibitor of p53.  It has a molecular weight of 367.30 and is soluble in DMSO up to 20 mg/mL.  Its melting point is 192.1-192.5 °C.

Ketones
Benzothiazoles
Bromides